Calabresi's blind-snake (Afrotyphlops calabresii) is a species of snake in the family Typhlopidae. It is found in northwestern Somalia, adjacent Ethiopia, and eastern Kenya. The specific name calabresii honours Enrica Calabresi.

References

calabresii
Snakes of Africa
Reptiles of Ethiopia
Reptiles of Kenya
Reptiles of Somalia
Reptiles described in 1965
Taxa named by Carl Gans
Taxa named by Raymond Laurent